Kansas Conference may refer to:

History
Lecompton Constitution, second of four proposed constitutions for the state of Kansas

Sports
Kansas Collegiate Athletic Conference, an intercollegiate athletic conference affiliated with the NAIA 
Kansas Jayhawk Community College Conference, a college athletic conference that is a member of the National Junior College Athletic Association
Big Seven Conference (Kansas), a high school athletics league in Kansas